"Kings & Queens" is a song by American singer Ava Max, released on March 12, 2020, through Atlantic Records as the fifth single from her debut studio album, Heaven & Hell (2020). The song was written by Max, Brett McLaughlin, Desmond Child, Hillary Bernstein, Jakke Erixson, Madison Love, Mimoza Blinsson, and producers Cirkut and RedOne. It is a power pop song that consists of an electric guitar with synthesizers, and contains an interpolation of Bonnie Tyler's 1986 song "If You Were a Woman (And I Was a Man)", which was additionally used in Bon Jovi's 1986 song "You Give Love a Bad Name". The lyrics incorporate the message of women's empowerment.

"Kings & Queens" received generally favorable reviews from music critics, who praised the production, guitar solo, and lyrics. The song topped the charts in Israel, Poland, and Slovenia, while peaking at number 13 on the US Billboard Hot 100, and at number 19 on the UK Singles Chart. It attained a platinum certification in ten countries, including the United States and United Kingdom. An accompanying music video was directed by Isaac Rentz, which depicts a Khaleesi-inspired Max dancing in a heaven-themed throne room alongside a group of dancers while feasting at a banquet. A remix of the song titled "Kings & Queens, Pt. 2" was released on August 6, 2020, which features American singer Lauv and rapper Saweetie.

Background and composition
"Kings & Queens" began development in 2018, when Max recorded the song in five separate studios located in Europe, Germany, and Los Angeles. The song went through ten different iterations which included different melodies and production, before the final version was completed around August to September 2019. Max wrote the verse and the pre-chorus alongside American songwriter Madison Love, before being given the chorus by Moroccan-Swedish record producer RedOne. The chorus originally just contained the melody, but was reworked in the studio with Leland, Love and Cirkut, where it interpolated the chorus melody of Bonnie Tyler's 1986 song "If You Were a Woman (And I Was a Man)", which was subsequently used in Bon Jovi's 1986 song "You Give Love a Bad Name". Desmond Child was consequently credited on "Kings & Queens" as a songwriter. Max decided to include the electric guitar in the track to complement the pop electronic sound in her music. "Kings & Queens" was announced on February 27, 2020, where Max confirmed that Cirkut, RedOne, and Love were involved with production. She later revealed the song's release date, with the title and artwork on March 7, 2020. It was written by Max, Leland, Child, Hillary Bernstein, Jakke Erixson, Love, Mimoza Blinsson, and producers Cirkut and RedOne.

Musically, "Kings & Queens" is a power pop song, which contains several pulsing verses and a hook containing synthesizers. The guitar solo following the second verse includes elements of glam rock, which Jon Blistein of Rolling Stone noted as having a "Queen-esque quality". Max stated that the lyrics to "Kings & Queens" describe how the world would be a better place with queens ruling the world. She likened it to her previous song "So Am I" (2019), acknowledging that it contained a similar message about women's empowerment. A line taken from the 1865 book Alice's Adventures in Wonderland by the Queen of Hearts was used in the song, "Disobey me, then baby, it's off with your head". Chess metaphors are incorporated in the lyrics.

Critical reception
Writing for MTV News, Madeline Rothman praised the song's strong electric guitar solo with the lyric, "You might think I'm weak without a sword / But if I had one it'd be bigger than yours". Mike Nied of Idolator noted that the single "highlights Ava's ability to fill dance floors across the globe". Nicholas Hautman of Us Weekly described "Kings & Queens" as "one of the best singles to come out of 2020 so far", praising Max's "powerful and theatrical vocals" and the guitar solo. Writing for Uproxx, Caitlin White described the lyrics as "a subtle tribute to the power of women and a call to action for men to support the queens in their life", while Heran Mamo of Billboard acknowledged that it compared chess moves to feminism; "In chess, the king can move one space at a time / But queens are free to go wherever they like". Soundigest writer Andrew Chinikidiadi praised the transitions of the electric guitar riff into the bridge and the song's ending. However, he lamented the repetition and duration of the track.

Billboard staff ranked "Kings & Queens" at number 53 on their listicle of The 100 Best Songs of 2020, acknowledging that it was the "unofficial anthem of the parade-free 2020 Pride season" during lockdown from the COVID-19 pandemic. They additionally placed the song on their unranked listicle of the 30 Best Pop Songs of 2020, comparing the "deceptively heartfelt" sound to hair metal from the 1980s.

Commercial performance
"Kings & Queens" debuted at number 73 on the Billboard Hot 100 chart dated August 22, 2020, where it peaked at number 13 on the chart dated November 24, 2020. It also topped the Adult Top 40 chart dated December 12, 2020. The song was certified double platinum by the Recording Industry Association of America (RIAA) on June 1, 2022, for sales of 2,000,000 units in the US. It was the first time Child's interpolated melody received a platinum certification since being used in 35 years. "Kings & Queens" peaked at number 15 on the Canadian Hot 100 for the chart dated January 16, 2021, and was eventually certified quadruple platinum by Music Canada (MC) on April 8, 2022, for 320,000 track-equivalent sales.

In the United Kingdom, "Kings & Queens" bowed at number 19 on the UK Singles Chart dated July 3, 2020, where it was certified platinum for selling 600,000 equivalent units in the country. In Israel, the song peaked at number one on the Media Forest airplay chart dated May 24, 2020. "Kings & Queens" also topped the Polish Airplay Top 100 on the chart issued June 27, 2020, where it was certified triple platinum by the Polish Society of the Phonographic Industry (ZPAV) for track-equivalent sales of 150,000 units. In Australia, the song bowed at number 31 on the ARIA Singles Chart dated October 4, 2020, where it charted for 11 weeks.

Music video
A visualizer was released along with the song on March 12, 2020, which depicts Max as a queen holding a glass of champagne and sword, with a royal deck of cards. She confirmed on the song's release date that she already filmed the official music video, describing it as "very colorful, super fun, crazy dancing, and a big celebration", and likened it to a rainbow. The music video was released on March 27, 2020, and is directed by Isaac Rentz. Max is seen dancing in a heaven-themed throne room with a group of dancers, as she was inspired by Khaleesi from American television series Game of Thrones, and wanted to portray an Amazonian queen surrounded by warriors. Max and Rentz used a moodboard to list several ideas for the feminist-themed music video, with the former often texting ideas to the latter during the night to ensure that it would be perceived as "authentic and personal". Max envisioned the video to be "royal, but in a modern, futuristic kind of way", to ensure that it would feel simple.

The video opens with Max holding a sword between her legs as she sits on a golden throne. She then organizes a banquet, in which several dancers begin drinking champagne and eating food, before performing a dance sequence. During the pre-bridge guitar solo, the dancers wield electric axes.

Track listing

Credits and personnel
Credits adapted from Tidal.

 Amanda Ava Koci – vocals, songwriting
 Henry Walter – songwriting, production
 RedOne – songwriting, production
 Chris Gehringer – mastering
 Serban Ghenea – mixing
 Brett McLaughlin – songwriting
 Desmond Child – songwriting
 Hillary Bernstein – songwriting
 Jakke Erixson – songwriting
 Madison Love – songwriting
 Mimoza Blinsson – songwriting

Charts

Weekly charts

Year-end charts

Certifications

Release history

Kings & Queens, Pt. 2

A remix of the song titled "Kings & Queens, Pt. 2" was released on August 6, 2020. It features American singer Lauv and rapper Saweetie. The song was recorded during quarantine from the COVID-19 pandemic, after initiation from Max.

Composition and lyrics
"Kings & Queens, Pt. 2" incorporates a new second verse from Lauv, who described the male perspective of being in a relationship with a strong, independent woman. He incorporates Auto-Tune in his vocals, which replaces his lovelorn lyrical style. Saweetie also adds a rap verse in the song, continuing the theme of female empowerment.

Track listing

References

2020 singles
2020 songs
American power pop songs
Atlantic Records singles
Ava Max songs
Lauv songs
Saweetie songs
Number-one singles in Poland
Songs with feminist themes
Songs written by Desmond Child
Songs written by RedOne
Songs written by Leland (musician)
Songs written by Cirkut (record producer)
Songs written by Madison Love
Songs written by Saweetie
Song recordings produced by Cirkut (record producer)
Song recordings produced by RedOne
Songs written by Ava Max
Number-one singles in Israel
Songs about royalty
LGBT-related songs